Andy Kirshner is an American composer, performer, writer, and media artist.
He is an assistant professor at the University of Michigan, jointly appointed by the School of Art and Design and the School of Music. He holds a doctorate in music composition from the University of Michigan, where he studied with William Bolcom, Evan Chambers, Curtis Curtis-Smith, Michael Daugherty, and George Wilson. Kirshner's music-theater works include The Museum of Life and Death,  a science fiction "interdisciplinary theater work" based on the medieval morality play Everyman; An Evening with Tony Amore for jazz voice and orchestra based on the persona of Frank Sinatra; Who It Is, a one-man musical about race and nationalism; the opera-oratorio The Watchtower inspired by apocalyptic TV newscasts and the Book of Isaiah; Dr. Nathan Feelgood In Person, an operetta for 10-piece blues band and a singing psychiatrist; and a cold-war musical for children with Dan Hurlin The Day the Earth Stood Still. He lives in Ann Arbor, Michigan with his wife, the sculptor and installation artist Stephanie Rowden.

Kirshner has also directed multiple films, including his 2016 feature debut, the musical-comedy Liberty's Secret. Though the film was originally intended as a satire of the political climate during the presidency of George W. Bush, Liberty's Secret ultimately took eight years to develop, and evolved into what Kirshner has described as "a traditional movie-musical – with a lesbian-political twist."

References

External links
 Homepage

American male composers
21st-century American composers
University of Michigan faculty
Living people
Place of birth missing (living people)
Year of birth missing (living people)
American entertainers
University of Michigan School of Music, Theatre & Dance alumni
21st-century American male musicians